Tulpar is a Turkish heavy infantry fighting vehicle designed by the Sakarya-based automotive manufacturer Otokar. It is named after the Tulpar, a winged horse in Turkic mythology.

The vehicle has been designed to augment Turkey's new-generation Altay MBT in operations and to safely transport infantry to the front lines while providing fire support for other armored units. The IFV is also available in variants such as reconnaissance, command-and-control, personnel carrier, mortar, recovery, launch rocket system, air defence, ambulance and anti-tank vehicles.

Background
Even though the TSK has not formally posted an immediate requirement for a new infantry fighting vehicle, Otokar has started the development of Tulpar along with the Altay. Indeed, Tulpar was designed by the same team that developed Altay. After a 3-year design and development stage, Tulpar was finally unveiled to the public in 2013 at the IDEF international defense fair in Istanbul.

Design
Tulpar was designed for the dual role of providing fire support to friendly main battle tanks and safely transporting troops in a high-threat environment. Resistance against IEDs, small mines and high ballistic protection for its crew were among the high priority design criteria. Tulpar is also fully networkable with the Altay MBT and other units.

In its basic form the Tulpar provides protection against small arms (STANAG 4569 level 2), but it can be upgraded with composite armor that provides protection against 25 mm projectiles (STANAG 4569 level 5). Tulpar features modular armor. This allows the maintenance center to quickly swap any damaged armor panels and also makes the IFV easily upgradable for added protection against higher caliber projectiles. Export customers of Tulpar can decide on what level of protection is desired based on their specific threat environment, terrain and IFV configuration.

Otokar plans to install a hard kill system on the future variants of Tulpar. The vehicle is fully NBC protected.

Mobility
Tulpar is powered by an 810 hp, 15.7-liter, water-cooled V8 diesel engine that is turbo charged and drives a 32-speed automatic transmission. Suspension comes standard with a hydraulic damper and can carry up to 45 tons on the hull. Tulpar's maximum speed is 70 km/h and economic range is 600 km.

Armament
Otokar's Tulpar is fitted with the Mızrak-U turret system armed with a 30mm dual-fed automatic cannon and a 7.62mm coaxial machine gun. The turret will be equipped with the Umtas anti-tank missile.

Situational awareness
Tulpar's crew enjoy full 360-degree day/night situational awareness thanks to an array of electro-optic sensors located on the Hull and Turret.

Variants

Tulpar IFV 
Basic IFV model as described above.

Tulpar-S 
First unveiled at IDEF 2015, the Tulpar-S is significantly lighter (15 tonnes), shorter and narrower than the Tulpar. It is a multi-purposed vehicle platform which retains basic features of standard Tulpar-IFV and  has been designed to be both a light and an amphibious platform. Like the Tupar IFV, the Tulpar has been designed to be modular and can be configured for a variety of roles with a variety of weapons platforms.

In the weapons-carrying, ATGM-armed RCT configuration, the Tulpar-S features a three-person crew (driver, commander, and gunner), with space for two dismounts. In its armoured-personnel-carrier version, the vehicle will also feature a three-person crew but with space for eight dismounts.

Operators
: Turkish Armed Forces is expected to initially order up to 400 vehicles to augment the first batch of 250 Altay main battle tanks pending the evaluation trials of the IFV.

See also 
 Anders
 ASCOD
 Bionix
 BMP-3
 Dardo
 K21
 M2 Bradley
 Puma
 Type 89
 Combat Vehicle 90
 Warrior

References

External links
 Military-Today 
 TR Defence 
 Tulpar Otokar AIFV tracked armoured infantry fighting vehicle on armyrecognition.com

Infantry fighting vehicles of Turkey
Armoured fighting vehicles of the post–Cold War period
Tracked infantry fighting vehicles
Military vehicles introduced in the 2010s